Canadian Solar Inc. is a publicly traded company that manufactures solar PV modules and runs large scale solar projects.

History 

Founded in 2001 in Guelph, Ontario, Canada by Shawn Qu, Canadian Solar (NASDAQ: CSIQ) has subsidiaries in over 24 countries on 6 continents. They manufacture solar PV modules, are involved in supporting the installation of solar energy, and are involved in a number utility-scale power projects. With the company's acquisition of Recurrent Energy, Canadian Solar's total project pipeline reached 20.4 GW, including an increase in the late-stage project pipeline to 2.4 GW.

In November 2006, the company went public at $15 per share.

Including two manufacturing facilities in Ontario, Canadian Solar employs nearly 9,000 workers worldwide. This translates to more than 16 GW of panel shipments, or approximately 70 million PV modules, in the past 15 years.

The Human Rights Foundation criticized the firm after a 2021 report by The Globe and Mail revealed the company operates a solar farm in Xinjiang, China nearby a Uyghur internment camp. The Guelph Mercury Tribune later revealed a second solar farm in Xinjiang. In response to a question about the firm at a news conference, Prime Minister Justin Trudeau said, "We will continue to work very, very closely and follow up with [Canadian Solar Inc., Dynasty Gold Corp. and GobiMin Inc.], and all companies that have investments in that area, to ensure they are following Canadian values and Canadian law." The Globe further uncovered that in 2019 Canadian Solar signed a major agreement with the polysilicon manufacturer GCL-Poly, a company whose Xinjiang subsidiary has ties to forced labour.
The Mercury Tribune reported Canadian Solar sold both of its Xinjiang solar farms in late 2021 to a consortium of various Chinese banks and investment groups.

Manufacturing 
Canadian Solar production facilities in Canada, China, Indonesia, Vietnam and Brazil make ingots, wafers, solar cells, solar PV modules, solar power systems, and other solar products.

The bulk of Canadian Solar's manufacturing facilities are located in Canada and China. The Ontario plant has a production capacity of over 500 MW per year.

Products
Canadian Solar offers solar modules, solar power systems, off-grid solar home systems and other solar products.

Canadian Solar's global PV project business unit has been in operation for over six years and develops PV projects worldwide, specializing in project development, system design, engineering and financing. In addition, Canadian Solar can handle the deployment of photovoltaic projects systems, ranging a few hundred kilowatts to mega-watts.

Canadian Solar's standard modules are powered by 156 x 156 mm (6 inch) mono-crystalline or poly-crystalline solar cells.

Projects 
Below are some of Canadian Solar's projects:

Europe 
 1 MW – Munich, Germany (July 2010) 
 70 MW – Solarpark Meuro, Meuro, Germany (August 2011)
 78 MW – Senftenberg Solarpark Senftenberg, Germany (September 2011)
 70 MW – Rovigo Photovoltaic Power Plant, Rovigo, Italy (November 2010)
 15 MW – Three systems of 5 MW each, Conwall, UK (September 2011)
 8 MW – Villeneuve de Marsan, France (April 2012)

North America 
 27 MW – Sunnybrook Health Services, Canada (2009)
 5 MW – Extreme Makeover: Home Edition, Georgia, USA (May 2010)
 148 MW – Ronald McDonald House, San Diego, California, USA (June 2010)
 5 MW – Keystone Solar Farm, Pennsylvania, USA (October 2012)
 8.5 MW - Canadian Solar 1 (CS1), Canada (August 2012)
 10 MW – Brockville 1, Canada (June 2013)
 9 MW – Brockville 2, Canada (September 2013)
 10 MW – Silvercreek Solar Park, Canada (January 2014)
 146.4 MW – Honduras (October 2014) 
 28.4 MW – Los Angeles, California (November 2014) 
 5.86 MW – Massachusetts (July 2014) 
 10 MW – Ontario, Canada (January 2015)
 100 MW – Ontario, Canada (July 2015) 
 100 MW – Texas Solar Project, Texas (November 2015) 
 100 MW – Kings County, California (August 2016) 
 200 MW – California (September 2016) 
 258 MW – Fresno County, California (September 2016) 
 60 MW – Los Angeles, California (September 2016) 
 5.74 MW – Fowler, California (November 2016)

South America 
 185 MW – Brazil (September 2016) 
 191.5 MW – Brazil (October 2016) 
 114 MW – Brazil (November 2016)

Asia-Pacific 
 30 MW - Near Tumxuk, Xinjiang, China (2019)
 10 MW – Ninxiahongsibao, China (August 2010)
 20 MW – Wulate, Inner Mongolia, China (December 2013)
 30 MW – Suzhou Golden Sun Projects, China (November 2012)
 25 MW – Gajner, Bikaner, Rajasthan, India (November 2013)
 1.3 MW – Hyogo, pref. Awaji city, Japan (January 2013)
 5 MW – Normanton Solar Farm, Australia (December 2015) 
 17.4 MW – Longreach Solar Farm, Australia (September 2016) 
 30 MW – Oakey Solar Farm, Australia (September 2016) 
 30 MW – Telangana, India (October 2016) 
190MW - Suntop Solar Farm - Australia (October 2020)
146MW - Gunnedah Solar Farm, Australia (October 2020)

Acquisitions 
Recurrent Energy: Canadian Solar completed the acquisition of solar developer Recurrent Energy from Sharp Corporation for approximately $265 million in 2015.

References

External links
 Official website

Renewable energy in Canada
Photovoltaics manufacturers
Companies based in Guelph
2001 establishments in Ontario
Energy companies established in 2001
Renewable resource companies established in 2001
Companies listed on the Nasdaq
Canadian brands
Canadian companies established in 2001